Self-objectification is when people view themselves as objects for use instead of as human beings. Self-objectification is a result of objectification, and is commonly discussed in the topic of sex and gender. Both men and women struggle with self-objectification, but it is most commonly seen among women. According to Calogero, self-objectification explains the psychological process by which women internalise people’s objectification of their bodies, resulting in them constantly criticizing their own bodies.

Relationship to objectification 
Objectification and self-objectification are two different topics, but are closely intertwined. Objectification looks at how society views people (in this case, women) as bodies for someone else's pleasure. This occurs in advertisements where the body but not the face of a woman is shown. These messages put an unrealistic standard on women's bodies, dehumanizing them to an object of visual pleasure, and self-objectification occurs in response. Women start to internalize the message that they are not individual human beings, but objects of beauty, pleasure, and play for men or women, and they start to look at themselves and their bodies as such.

The perpetuation of self-objectification can be described as a cycle. Objectification causes self-objectification which perpetuates objectification, and the cycle goes on. Both media and social interaction factor into that cycle as well. Media is everywhere, plastering seemingly perfect women across billboards, in music videos, and on covers of magazines. These ideals cause people to put on an unrealistic lens, thinking that they should look and act like the women in the media are portrayed, perpetuating the cycle of self-objectification. Social interactions affect this cycle as well, as the way people communicate with each other subconsciously furthers objectification as well. This type of talk is known as appearance related communication. Two types of appearance related communication that have had an effect on the existence of self-objectification are old talk and fat talk, where obese and overweight women are commonly criticized by the health industry, and old women are made to feel useless and "worn out" due to the often-cited associated negative health consequences of their old age.

Appearance-related communication 
Fat talk, a term coined by Mimi Nichter, refers to women making comments about their own weight, dieting, or justifications of one's eating or exercising habits. It includes comments such as, "I'm out of shape", or "I'm just eating everything today". Women who engage in fat talk are more likely to struggle with body dissatisfaction, self-objectification, depression, anorexia, bulimia, and other eating disorders.

Old talk refers to negative statements about wrinkles, skin tone, yellowing teeth, and other physical aspects of the natural aging process. Women who engage in old talk are more likely to be dissatisfied with their bodies, engage in self-objectification, suffer from depression and anxiety, and it may even decrease their quality of life and actual lifespan. Both fat and old talk result in higher self-objectification, as women measure themselves against and attempt to reach an unrealistic standard.

In different generations 
One period of time in a woman's life where self-objectification happens excessively is during pregnancy. Magazines offer pictures of pregnant celebrities with golden skin, toned legs, and a perfectly rounded, "cute" pregnant belly. The photo-editing makes it seem real, and people start to think that is how they ought to look when they are pregnant. Looking at these perfect pictures results in pregnant women feeling worse about themselves and being incredibly self-conscious about their weight even though their weight gain is normal and necessary. They see themselves as not good enough, again, objectifying their identity to a body that needs to be perfect. Studies have also been done on adolescent girls, and what heightens self-objectification at an early age. With the amount of over-sexualized media that children are exposed to, young girls start to identify themselves as a "prize" to be used and given away at an early age. This objectification is fueled heavily by media and the fact that it is highly sexualized. The more a young girl is exposed to media that sexually objectifies women, the more they will internalize those beliefs and ideals and objectify themselves.

See also
Sexual objectification
Objectification of people

References

Further reading 
  
 

Conceptions of self
Feminist theory